Pangyo (Pangyo Techno Valley) Station is a station on the Shinbundang Line, serving the planned city of Pangyo in the city of Seongnam. The station is close to Pangyo Techno Valley, one of the country's largest clusters of software, gaming, entertainment and biotechnology businesses, home to major tech companies like Kakao. It began operations on October 28, 2011, with the opening of the Shinbundang Line.

In 2016, it became the western terminus of the Gyeonggang Line. Additionally Pangyo is expected to become the southern terminus of Seoul Subway Line 8 sometime around 2023.

The station is in close proximity to the Hyundai Department Store Pangyo location, the largest department store in the Seoul Capital Area, which opened in August 2015.

There is a light display between Pangyo Station and Cheonggyesan Station for advertisement. A battery of light emitting vertical bars spans 486 meters in the tunnel. In a train that runs at 90 km/h, these light emitting bars create an illusion of animated picture frames. The system is called eTAS, which stands for Ethernet Tunnel Advertisement System.

Station layout

References

Seoul Metropolitan Subway stations
Bundang
Metro stations in Seongnam
Railway stations opened in 2011
Gyeonggang Line